David Johnston Robertson Clyne (1 July 1916 – 12 May 1944) was a Scottish amateur footballer who played as a right back in the Scottish League for Queen's Park. He was capped by Scotland at amateur level.

Personal life 
Clyne served as a flight sergeant in the Royal Air Force Volunteer Reserve during the Second World War. On 12 May 1944, Clyne took off from RAF Oban with 9 aboard in a Catalina flying boat to conduct a training exercise. Over Vatersay, Clyne became disoriented and the plane crashed into Heisheaval Beag hill, killing himself and two passengers. He was buried in Riddrie Park Cemetery, Glasgow.

References 

Association football fullbacks
Scottish footballers
Queen's Park F.C. players
Scottish Football League players
Scotland amateur international footballers
1916 births
1944 deaths
Royal Air Force personnel killed in World War II
Royal Air Force Volunteer Reserve personnel of World War II
People from Dennistoun
Royal Air Force airmen
Royal Air Force pilots of World War II
British World War II bomber pilots
Footballers from Glasgow